The 1989 Junior World Sports Acrobatics Championships was the first edition of the acrobatic gymnastics competition, then named sports acrobatics, and took place in Katowice, Poland, from December 1 to December 3, 1989. The competition was organized by the International Federation of Sports Acrobatics (IFSA).

Medal summary

Results

References

Junior World Acrobatic Gymnastics Championships
Junior World Acrobatic Gymnastics Championships
International gymnastics competitions hosted by Poland
Junior World Gymnastics Championships
Sports competitions in Katowice